Martín Peña may refer to:

 Martín Peña (Hato Rey), one of the 12 sectors of Hato Rey, Puerto Rico
 Martín Peña (Santurce), one of the forty sectors of Santurce, San Juan, Puerto Rico
 Martín Peña Channel, a body of water in San Juan, Puerto Rico